Abdul Latiff Sinnalebbe (born 16 November 1932) was a Ceylonese politician. He was the second member of Parliament of Sri Lanka from Batticaloa representing the United National Party from 1965 to 1970. His father Mudaliar Ahamed Lebbe Sinne Lebbe and his son Ahamed Rizvi Sinnalebbe, both represented Batticaloa in parliament.

See also 
List of political families in Sri Lanka

References

Members of the 6th Parliament of Ceylon
United National Party politicians
1932 births

Date of death missing
Year of death missing